Sodefuri Au mo Tashou no En is the upcoming fifth studio album by Japanese pop-rock band Chicago Poodle. It will release on 16 August 2017 by Giza Studio label.

Background
The release gasp between their previous studio album, Life Is Beautiful, three years is the biggest during their career.

According to the interview on the question about main theme of the album is, "how the casual things in life happens to meet people who are complete strangers to us, yet there are possibilities of meeting them in previous life".

The album consists of previously one limited released single Made In Smile.

Heian no Bu Kyoto Bu and bonus track La・La・La Love & Peace has received album mix in this album. The original song was performed, written and arranged by Kouta Hanazawa. It was introduced during the music event Rimpa Rock (琳派ロック).

There was confirmed hole one man tour around the Japan with the same title as the album has, Sodefuri Au mo Tashou no En.

Chart performance
The album reached No. 55 in Oricon Weekly Rankings in its first week.

Track listing

Usage in media
 "Tsunagumono" was used in a commercial for The Iyo Bank in  2017
 "Made In Smile" was used in a commercial for The Iyo Bank in 2015
 "Futari Hitotsu" was used in a commercial for the product Quick Pon by Increase Hair
 "Heian no Bu Kyoto Bu/La・La・La Love & Peace" were used as no. 2 theme song for event Rimpa Rock

References 

Giza Studio albums
Being Inc. albums
Japanese-language albums
2017 albums
Chicago Poodle albums